The siege of Menagh Air Base (also spelled Menegh, Mannagh, or Minakh) was an armed confrontation between the Free Syrian Army and aligned Islamist rebel groups on one hand, and the Syrian Armed Forces on the other.

Background
After months of conflict and failure on the part of the rebels to overthrow Bashar al-Assad's government, some rebels began to switch tactics to targeting government-held military bases. The Menagh Air Base had been a crucial military base used by Syrian military aircraft to bomb rebel forces in the north of the country, particularly in Aleppo city.

Siege

2012
The first major rebel assault against the base came in the weeks following the start of the Battle of Aleppo. Rebel fighters from the Free Syrian Army and affiliated groups launched an attack against the air base on 2 August 2012 using a combination of small arms, rocket-propelled grenades, and five tanks they captured during the Battle of Anadan. The base was used by Syrian Air Force helicopters and jet aircraft to bombard rebel positions, and seizing it was seen as vital to the rebels in their advances across northern Syria.

The initial rebel attack on the base in early August was fought off by government troops entrenched inside the air base's perimeter, though rebel commanders said they would continue the siege and capture the base.

Heavy fighting broke out on the night of 27 December and continued "all night", as rebels once again assaulted the besieged base. MiG warplanes bombed rebel positions on the outskirt of the base in an effort to alleviate some of the pressure on the defenders.

2013
By January 2013, the base still held out against the rebels, despite being besieged on all sides. The remaining defenders were receiving supplies of weapons and food, as well as medical evacuations by helicopter; however, these flights became increasingly risky for pilots as rebel forces gained access to heavy weaponry and fired upon government helicopters. At this point the rebels estimated roughly 300 soldiers remained defending the air base. Soldiers who defected from the base reported that food supplies were a major issue and that soldiers were given rations of dry rice and wheat and told to "make what they can from it". Self-inflicted injuries were also reported as soldiers attempted to get away from the fighting.

On 8 February, the Syrian Air Force bombed parts of the base after rebels stormed it, which forced the rebel fighters to retreat.

A rebel attack was once again repulsed by government troops on 28 April, though rebels did manage to overrun some parts of the base before being forced to withdraw.

On 5 May 2013, as the siege of the base continued and government soldiers still refused to surrender, rebels launched their biggest offensive against the base to date, overrunning several Army positions and moving deep inside the base and capturing a tank, although they came under heavy aerial attack by the Syrian air force. Rebels claimed that a group of pilots defected and assassinated the base's commanding officer. The defecting pilots told rebels that around 200 soldiers remained in the base, garrisoned in the headquarters building supported by a handful of tanks. Many soldiers resorted to sleeping under tanks, fearing a rebel assault.

On 9 May 2013, it was reported that, although they managed to capture parts of the Menagh Air Base, rebel forces were forced to retreat from the base due to heavy air strikes.

On 28 May 2013, rebel sources reported that the government conducted a successful airborne resupply mission to the Menagh after several thousand FSA and jihadist rebels moved west to launch an attack on Kurdish fighters of the People's Protection Units (YPG) in the Afrin region, bringing critical military and logistical supplies to the air base. The Kurdish Front Brigade also withdrew its participation in the siege in order to join forces with the YPG to repel the attack on Afrin.

On 7 June 2013, rebel forces attacked the air base and fired tank shells at its command building, but were once again repelled. Rebel forces launched another assault on 10 June, and by the next day had managed to secure the control tower after heavy fighting. Government forces responded by shelling rebel held parts of the base. On 17 June, rebels clashed with pro-government fighters from Nubbul and Zahra who were headed for Menagh in an effort to reinforce the soldiers left in the base.

On 23 June 2013 the Syrian Observatory for Human Rights reported that rebels had detonated a large car bomb in the government-held area of Menagh, which killed 12 soldiers and destroying many buildings within the airport. The explosion was reportedly followed by missile fire on army positions.

Final assault

After ten months of siege warfare, the different rebels groups at Menagh finally decided to coordinate in order to launch a large-scale assault on the base and capture it. Several insurgent militias taking part in this coordinated effort were actually hostile toward each other (for example, the Northern Storm Brigade had clashed with ISIL as late as July 2013); nevertheless, they put their differences mostly aside for the final attack on Menagh Air Base. The rebels prepared their assault against the base with a three-day long bombardment using artillery, mortars, and machineguns. The attack was carried out on 5 August 2013, led by Abu Omar al-Shishani, a chief commander of the jihadist Islamic State of Iraq and the Levant (ISIL). By this point, 70–120 government soldiers had remained, holding out in a small section of the complex.

The attack started when two foreign suicide bombers from ISIL's JAMWA, one of them a Saudi, drove a BMP armored personnel carrier right up to the airport's command center and blew themselves up, destroying the building and killing or scattering the defenders. Despite this, the surviving soldiers continued to offer heavy resistance, as ISIL along with FSA and Islamist forces stormed the base from three sides. By the morning of the next day, however, rebel forces had full control of the airport. In course of the final battle, 32 government soldiers and at least 19 rebels were killed. According to the insurgents on the morning of the final attack, 10 soldiers defected to the rebels and claimed to have attempted but failed to kill the base commander, who was later captured as he attempted to retreat with his men. Though most of the aircraft which had been originally been stationed at the airbase was distributed to other bases during the siege, the Syrian Air Force lost at least five Mil Mi-8 helicopters at Menagh.

About 70 soldiers, who managed to flee from the base during the battle, surrendered themselves (and two tanks) the next day to the People's Protection Units (YPG) in the town of Afrin, about 15 kilometers west of the airbase.  It was later reported that the surrendered troops were from the 17th Division and some officers from those surrendered troops were turned over by the YPG to the al-Nusra Front in exchange for Arab and Kurdish YPG prisoners al-Nusra captured from previous battles. Al-Nusra then executed the officers they had received. The YPG later apologized for the incident.

Aftermath
The fall of Menagh Air Base fortified the rebel control over much of northernwestern Syria. The role of JAMWA in the siege, however, strengthened outside perception of the Syrian insurgency as one relying heavily on foreign Jihadists. Extremist islamists generally portrayed the victory as being one for their cause. Regional expert Joanna Paraszczuk argued that the importance of JAMWA in the siege of Menagh Air Base should not be overstated, however, as the victory was achieved through the coordination of numerous rebel groups and not just the activities of JAMWA.

Two and a half years after the siege's end, in February 2016, the Syrian Democratic Forces supported by Russian airstrikes captured Menagh Air Base from the rebels.

References

Works cited 

 

Aleppo in the Syrian civil war
Sieges of the Syrian civil war
Military operations of the Syrian civil war in 2013
Military operations of the Syrian civil war involving the Free Syrian Army
Military operations of the Syrian civil war involving the al-Nusra Front
Military operations of the Syrian civil war involving the Islamic State of Iraq and the Levant
Military operations of the Syrian civil war involving the Syrian government